, also known as Kutsuki Oki-no kami Minamoto-no Masatsuna, was a hereditary Japanese daimyō of Oki and Ōmi with holdings in Tanba and Fukuchiyama.  His warrior clan was amongst the hereditary vassals of the Tokugawa family (the fudai) in the Edo period. His childhood name was Tomojiro (斧次郎).

Masatsuna was a polymath and a keen student of whatever information was available at that time concerning the West.  Since most printed material was only available in the Dutch language, such studies were commonly called "Dutch learning" (rangaku).

Dutch Japanologist Isaac Titsingh considered Masatsuna to have been his closest friend while he was in Japan, and their correspondence continued after Titsingh last left Dejima for the last time.  The oldest surviving letter from Masatsuna to Titsingh dates from 1789; and this letter mentions mutual friends such as Shimazu Shigehide (the father-in-law of the eleventh shōgun, Tokugawa Ienari) and Kuze Hirotami (Nagasaki bugyō or governor of Nagasaki port).

Masatsuna and Titsingh shared an interest in numismatics. After Titsingh was reassigned from Japan in 1784, he sent packages of coins from India—Dutch coppers, as well as coins from India, Russia, Turkey, and Africa.  Titsingh in turn received Japanese and Chinese coins as gifts.

Masatsuna was an author of several treatises on numismatics.  He was the first in Japan to circulate a book about non-Japanese coins with impressions taken from actual coins which had been obtained from Western traders.

Masatsuna's collection of coins was brought to the UK in the 19th century, and is now in the British Museum and the Ashmolean Museum.

Family
 Father: Kutsuki Tsunasada (1713-1788)
 Foster Father: Kutsuki Nobutsuna (1731-1787)
 Wives:
 Ikumanhime, Matsudaira Munenobu’s daughter
 Honda Sukemitsu‘s daughter
 Ito Nagatoshi’s daughter
 Children:
 Yuunosuke
 Kutsuki Tsunakata (1787-1838), adopted by Tomotsuna
 Yonekura Masanaga
 Fukuju Taro
 Adopted Son: Katsuki Tomotsuna (1767-1803)

Events of the daimyōs life
 1781 (Tenmei 1): This numismatist scholar's book, Shinzen zenpu ("Newly selected manual of numismatics"), was published.
 1782 (Tenmei 2): This numismatist scholar's analysis of copper currency in China and Japan "Shinzen zenpu" was presented to the emperor.
 1785 (Tenmei 5): This numismatist scholar's book, Kaisei kōhō zukan ("Corrected Illustrated mirror of coinage"), was published.
 1785 (Tenmei 5): Masatsuna inherited his father's position and titles.
 1787 (Tenmei 7): This rangaku/numismatist scholar's book, Seiyō senpu (Notes on Western Coinage), with plates showing European and colonial currency, was  completed.   -- see online image of 2 adjacent pages from library collection of Kyoto University of Foreign Studies and Kyoto Junior College of Foreign Languages
 1789 (Kansei 1): This rangaku/geographer scholar's book, Taisei yochi zusetsu ("Illustrated explanation of Western geography"), was published.
 1800 (Kansei 11): Masatsuna retires, handing over his position and titles to his son, Mototsuna.
 1801 (Kansei 12): Mototsuna predeceased his father, and Masatsuna's grandson, Tsunagata becomes daimyō.
 1802 (Kansei 13): Masatsuna dies.
 1807 (Bunka 4): Isaac Titsingh sends his last letter to Masatsuna from Europe, not knowing that his old friend had died some years earlier. Titsingh's decided to dedicate his translation of Nihon Ōdai Ichiran to Masatsuna.

Selected work
Kutsuki's published writings encompass 8 works in 12 publications in 1 language and 25 library holdings.

 1781 -- 
 1785 --  ;  note that only one copy known to exist.
 1787 -- , also romanized as Seiyō senpu
 1789 -- .
 1790 —

Notes

References
 Lequin, Frank, ed. (1990).  The Private Correspondence of Isaac Titsingh, [Japonica neerlandica, IV] Amsterdam: J. C. Gieben.  
 Screech, Timon. (2006). Secret Memoirs of the Shoguns:  Isaac Titsingh and Japan, 1779–1822. London: RoutledgeCurzon. 
 Titsingh, Isaac. (1834).  Annales des empereurs du Japon (Nihon Ōdai Ichiran).  Paris: Royal Asiatic Society, Oriental Translation Fund of Great Britain and Ireland. OCLC 5850691

Further reading
 The private correspondence of Kutsuki Masatsuna and Isaac Titsingh, 1785–1807: compiled in celebration of the friendship between Kutsuki Masatsuna and Isaac Titsingh, Fukuchiyama, November 1992.  OCLC 069107485
 Catalogue of the Japanese coin collection (pre-Meiji) at the British Museum, with special reference to Kutsuki Masatsuna, by Shin’ichi Sakuraki, Helen Wang and Peter Kornicki, with Nobuhisa Furuta, Timon Screech and Joe Cribb, British Museum Research Publication 174 (2010), .

Daimyo
Numismatists
1750 births
1802 deaths
Kutsuki clan
Rangaku